Ogbodo is a surname. Notable people with the surname include:

Jeremiah Ogbodo (born 1991), Nigerian fashion stylist
Uche Ogbodo (born 1986), Nigerian film actress and producer

Surnames of Nigerian origin